The 1937 Argentine Primera División was the 46th season of top-flight football in Argentina. The season began on April 4 and ended on December 19. There were 18 teams in the tournament, and River Plate won the championship.

Final table

References

Argentine Primera Division
Primera Division
Argentine Primera División seasons